William Henry Lawrence (March 11, 1906 – June 15, 1997) was a professional baseball player. He played part of one season in Major League Baseball with the Detroit Tigers in 1932, primarily as an outfielder.

Lawrence also had an extensive minor league baseball career, playing fifteen seasons from 1929 until 1943. In all but two of those seasons, he spent at least part of the season playing in Seattle for the Indians and, later, the Rainiers of the Pacific Coast League.

Sources

Major League Baseball outfielders
Detroit Tigers players
Boston Braves scouts
San Francisco Seals (baseball) players
Seattle Indians players
Toronto Maple Leafs (International League) players
Seattle Rainiers players
Baseball players from California
1906 births
1997 deaths